15077/15078 Kamakhya - Gomti Nagar Superfast Express is an Express train belonging to Indian Railways – North Eastern Railway zone that runs between  railway station of Lucknow, Uttar Pradesh and  railway station of Guwahati, Assam in India.
The train in its journey covers Uttar Pradesh, Bihar, West Bengal and Assam.

Timings
For reverse direction, the train starts from  every Monday at 10:00 and reaches  on Tuesday at 15:30.

Route

Uttar Pradesh

Bihar

West Bengal
New Jalpaiguri (Siliguri)

Assam

Goalpara Town



Traction

Coach Composition
15077/15078 Gomti Nagar - Kamakhya /Kamakhya - Gomti  Nagar Express consists of Two Second AC (2AC) coaches, Six Third AC (3AC) coaches, Six Sleeper (SL) coaches, Four Second Sitting(2S) coaches Engine and One End On Generator (EOG) coach.

References

Express trains in India
North Eastern Railway zone
Passenger trains originating from Lucknow
Transport in Guwahati
Rail transport in Bihar
Rail transport in Uttar Pradesh
Rail transport in West Bengal
Rail transport in Assam